The 2020 AMA Supercross Championship is an American motorcycle racing championship that started January 4, 2020, and ended June 21, 2020.  Ten of the 17 rounds had been completed when the season was suspended on March 12, 2020, as a result of the COVID-19 pandemic.  On May 14, 2020, promoter Feld Entertainment announced the season would conclude with races on Wednesdays and Sundays at Rice-Eccles Stadium in Salt Lake City, Utah.

Results

Events Rescheduled / Relocated 
Races at rounds 11-17 were cancelled due to the COVID-19 outbreak.  On March 25, 2020, Feld Motor Sports announced their intention to complete the season later in the year.  On May 14, 2020, the Feld Motor Sports announced the season would finish with seven races over May and June behind closed doors.  These races were held at Rice-Eccles Stadium in Salt Lake City, Utah, which was to have hosted just Round 17 on May 2.  Six venues lost their events.

Notes

Season Recap 
Justin Barcia opened the season with his second consecutive win at Anaheim 1. One week later, Ken Roczen took his first win three years after suffering a hard crash that had left him with a badly injured arm.  At Round 3, Eli Tomac became the third different winner in as many races to open the 2020 season.  Roczen and Tomac would proceed to dominate the middle portion of the season, with the exception of the San Diego Supercross where defending champion Cooper Webb took the victory.  After the season was suspended by the COVID-19 pandemic, Feld Motor Sports announced the season would  finish in four weeks with seven rounds in Salt Lake City, with Sunday and Wednesday rounds only. Webb and Tomac would win most of the races while Roczen and Zach Osborne would each win 1. Tomac would win the title.

450SX

Riders Championship

References

AMA Supercross Championship
AMA Supercross
AMA Supercross
AMA Supercross Championship